The San Jose Lasers were a women's professional basketball team in San Jose, California.  It was a member of the American Basketball League. Their home games were primarily held at the San Jose State Event Center with an occasional game being played at the San Jose Arena. The head coach of the Lasers for their first season was Jan Lowrey, who was fired after an 18-22 season. For the second and partial 3rd season, the head coach was Angela Beck, who gave up her position as the University of Nebraska women's basketball coach, to head the Lasers.

The team folded along with the rest of the league during the third ABL season in 1998.

References

American Basketball League (1996–1998) teams
Defunct basketball teams in the United States
Basketball teams established in 1996
Sports clubs disestablished in 1998
Basketball teams in the San Francisco Bay Area
Defunct basketball teams in California
1996 establishments in California
1998 disestablishments in California
Women's sports in California